Claudine Vita (born 19 September 1996 in Frankfurt an der Oder) is a German athlete competing in the discus throw and shot put. She won a gold medal at the 2017 European U23 Championships.

Personal life
Vita was born in Germany to Angolan parents.

International competitions

Personal bests

Outdoor
Shot put – 17.90 (Neubrandenburg 2016)
Discus throw – 65.20 (Munich 2022)

Indoor
Shot put – 18.09 (Belgrade 2017)

References

External links 
 

1996 births
Living people
German female discus throwers
German female shot putters
Sportspeople from Frankfurt (Oder)
German people of Angolan descent
Universiade silver medalists for Germany
Universiade medalists in athletics (track and field)
Medalists at the 2019 Summer Universiade
Athletes (track and field) at the 2020 Summer Olympics
Olympic athletes of Germany
20th-century German women
21st-century German women
European Athletics Championships medalists